Hygrine is a pyrrolidine alkaloid, found mainly in coca leaves (0.2%). It was first isolated by Carl Liebermann in 1889 (along with a related compound cuscohygrine) as an alkaloid accompanying cocaine in coca. Hygrine is extracted as a thick yellow oil, having a pungent taste and odor.

See also 
 Coca alkaloids
 Pseudotropine
 Troparil

References 

 
 
 

Pyrrolidine alkaloids
Alkaloids found in Erythroxylum coca
Ketones